Thomastown Football Club are known as the Bears and are an Australian rules football club located 17 km north of Melbourne in the suburb of Thomastown, Victoria fielding teams in the Northern Football League.

Today they are in Division Two of the NFL, and currently hold four netball teams entered in the NFL.

Timeline of the Thomastown F.C
Established as a Junior club at end of 1966 to provide recreation for the youth of the local area.

1975–1979  (VAFA)
Under 19s.
 
The Senior club was established at the end of 1975.

1976–1979  (Panton Hill Football League)
1980–2000 (VAFA)
The Bears first Senior premiership was the E Grade in 1983,  21.12.138 to Old Trinity 14.9.93 going through as Premiers and Champions.

The Bears second Senior premiership was the D1  Grade  in 1989,  21.10.136 to Old Mentonians 9.16.70.

2001–2006 Diamond Valley Football League Division Two
2007 Northern Football League Division Two. Reserves defeat Lalor to win Premiership
2008 Thomastown's third Senior Premiership was the Division Two in 2008, 16.10.106 to Macleod 12.15.87.
2009-2009 Northern Football League Division One,  0 wins 18 losses
2010 Thomastown enter Netball team into NFL competition
2010–2012 Northern Football League Division Two.
2011 Thomastown enters 2 Netball teams into the NFL competition with the A team going down by 5 goals in the Section 3 Grand Final. Under 19's lose the Preliminary Final. Thomastown Auskick commences 
2013 Northern Football League Division Three. Thomastown Enter first Junior teams since 1995
2014 Thomastown's wins their Fourth Senior Premiership in Division Three by defeating Reservoir 17.16.118 to 5.9.39. U16 win GF defeating Greensborough by 48 points
2015 NFL Division 2 Seniors finish 5th. Reserves win Premiership defeating Whittlesea by 5 points. Thomastown Netball 2 win GF defeating Nth Heidelberg by 5 Goals
2016 NFL Division 2 Seniors finish 5th. Reserves win Premiership defeating Hurstbridge by 2 points. Thomastown 1 Netball lost GF to Watsonia by 7 Goals
2017 NFNL Division 2 Seniors finish 5th. Thomastown 2 Netball win GF defeating Nth Heidelberg by 5 goals, while Thomastown 3 Netball lose GF to Hurstbridge by 12 Goals
2018 NFNL Division 2 Finish 4th losing to Banyule in 1st Semi Final. Thomastown 3 Netball lose GF by 2 Goals to Greensborough

Premiership Years

Victorian Amateurs Football Association (2):

1983, 1989

Northern Football League (formerly Diamond Valley Football League) (2):

2008, 2014

Runners Up

1980, 1995

Players of note 
Alex Marcou with Carlton Football Club
David Glascott with Carlton Football Club
Stuart Glascott with Brisbane Bears
Michael Sinni with Prahran Football Club 1993 J J Liston Trophy winner VFA/VFL

Australian rules football clubs in Melbourne
Northern Football League (Australia) clubs
Australian rules football clubs established in 1966
1966 establishments in Australia
Victorian Amateur Football Association clubs
Sport in the City of Whittlesea